Amon of Judah was the fifteenth King of Judah who, according to the biblical account, succeeded his father Manasseh of Judah. Amon is most remembered for his idolatrous practices during his short two-year reign, which led to a revolt against him and eventually to his assassination in c. 641 BC.

Life
Amon was the son of King Manasseh of Judah and Meshullemeth, a daughter of Haruz of Jotbah. Although the date is unknown, the Hebrew Bible records that he married Jedidah, the daughter of Adaiah of Bozkath. Following Manasseh's death, Amon began his reign of Judah at the age of 22, and reigned for two years. The Jerusalem Bible describes Manasseh and Amon as "two wicked kings". Biblical scholar and archeologist William F. Albright has dated his reign to 642–640, while professor E. R. Thiele offers the dates 643/642 – 641/640. Thiele's dates are tied to the reign of Amon's son Josiah, whose death at the hands of Pharaoh Necho II occurred in the summer of 609. The battle in which Josiah is said to have died, which is independently confirmed in Egyptian history, places the end of Amon's reign, 31 years earlier, in 641 or 640 and the beginning of his rule in 643 or 642.

The Hebrew Bible records that Amon continued his father Manasseh's practice of idolatry and set up pagan images as his father had done. II Kings states that Amon "did that which was evil in the sight of Yahweh, as did Manasseh his father. And he walked in all the way that his father walked in, and served the idols that his father served, and worshipped them." Similarly, II Chronicles records that "…he did that which was evil in the sight of the Lord, as did Manasseh his father; and Amon sacrificed unto all the graven images which Manasseh his father had made, and served them." The Talmudic tradition recounts that "Amon burnt the Torah, and allowed spider webs to cover the altar [through complete disuse] ... Amon sinned very much." Like other textual sources, Flavius Josephus too criticizes the reign of Amon, describing his reign in similar terms to the biblical accounts.

Arnold J. Toynbee considers that Amon was a pious conservative, defending the faith of his ancestors from Yahweh-only iconoclasts.

After reigning two years, Amon was assassinated by his servants or officials, who conspired against him, and he was succeeded by his son Josiah, who at the time was eight years old. After Amon's assassination his murderers became unpopular with the "people of the land", and they were ultimately killed. It was the people of the land who proclaimed Josiah as his successor; it is not clear what succession would have been anticipated by the officials who assassinated Amon. Some scholars, such as Abraham Malamat, assert that Amon was assassinated because people disliked the heavy influence that Assyria, an age-old enemy of Judah responsible for the destruction of the Kingdom of Israel, had upon him.

Era
Amon's reign was in the midst of a transitional time for the Levant and the entire Mesopotamian region. To the east of Judah, the Assyrian Empire was beginning to disintegrate while the Babylonian Empire had not yet risen to replace it. To the west, Egypt was still recovering under Psamtik I from its Assyrian occupation, transforming from a vassal state to an autonomous ally. In this power vacuum, many smaller states such as Judah were able to govern themselves without foreign intervention from larger empires.

Rabbinic Literature
The opinion that Amon was the most sinful of all the wicked kings of Judah (II Chron. xxxiii. 23) is brought out in the Talmud (Sanh. 103b) as follows:
(Sanh. 104a)
Ahaz suspended the sacrificial worship, Manasseh tore down the altar, Amon made it a place of desolation [covered it with cobwebs]; Ahaz sealed up the scrolls of the Law (Isa. viii. 16), Manasseh cut out the sacred name, Amon burnt the scrolls altogether [compare Seder Olam, R. xxiv. This is derived from the story of the finding of the Book of the Law, II Kings, xxii. 8]; Ahab permitted incest, Manasseh committed it himself, Amon acted as Nero was said to have done toward his mother Agrippina. And yet, out of respect for his son Josiah, Amon's name was not placed on the list of the kings excluded from the world to come. A midrashic fragment preserved in the Apostolical Constitutions, ii. 23, which appears to follow an account of the repentance of Manasseh according to a lost Jewish apocryphal writing, reads:
"No sin is more grievous than idolatry, for it is treason against God. Yet even this has been forgiven upon sincere repentance; but he that sins from a mere spirit of opposition, to see whether God will punish the wicked, shall find no pardon, although he say in his heart, 'I shall have peace in the end (by repenting), though I walk in the stubbornness of my evil heart'" (Deut. xxix. 19). Such a one was Amon, the son of Manasseh, for the (Apocryphal) Scripture says: "And Amon reasoned an evil reasoning of transgression and said: 'My father from his childhood was a great transgressor, and he repented in his old age. So will I now walk after the lust of my soul and afterward return to the Lord.' And he committed more evil in the sight of the Lord than all that were before him; but the Lord God speedily cut him off from this good land. And his servants conspired against him and slew him in his own house, and he reigned two years only."
It is noteworthy that this very midrashic fragment casts light upon the emphatic teaching of the Mishnah (Yoma, viii. 9): "Whosoever says, 'I will sin and repent thereafter,' will not be granted the time for repentance."

See also

Kings of Judah
Kingdom of Judah

Notes

References

7th-century BC Kings of Judah
7th-century BC murdered monarchs
660s BC births
640s BC deaths
People murdered in Israel
Biblical murder victims
Dethroned monarchs
Male murder victims
Jewish royalty